Russian Soil is a 1941 short documentary film produced in the Soviet Union. At the 14th Academy Awards, it was nominated for the Best Documentary Short.

References

External links

1941 films
1940s Russian-language films
Soviet short documentary films
Soviet black-and-white films
1940s short documentary films
1941 documentary films
Black-and-white documentary films
Documentary films about World War II